Celsius is a temperature scale.

Celsius may also refer to:
Celsius family, the Swedish family to which Anders Celsius, the inventor of the Celsius temperature scale, belongs
Celsius (comics), a DC Comics superhero
Celsius (crater), a lunar crater
4169 Celsius, an asteroid
Celsius Mission, the flight of Swedish ESA astronaut Christer Fuglesang to the International Space Station
Celsius, a fictional airship in Final Fantasy X-2
Celsius, a fictional spirit in Tales of Symphonia and other Tales games
Fujitsu Celsius, a line of workstation computers made by Fujitsu
 Celsius Network, a bankrupt cryptocurrency company and wallet

People with the surname
Anders Celsius (1701–1744), Swedish astronomer and inventor of the Celsius temperature scale
Magnus Celsius (1621–1679), Swedish astronomer and mathematician, grandfather of Anders Celsius
Olof Celsius (1670–1756), Swedish botanist, philologist and clergyman, uncle of Anders Celsius

See also
 Celcius (album), a rap album by Tech N9ne